Aitor Fernández López (born 23 August 1986), known simply as Aitor, is a Spanish former professional footballer who played as a right-back.

Club career
Born in Valdepares, Asturias, Aitor began his career with Racing de Santander, but only appeared for the reserves during his spell with the club. He also had a loan stint with SD Ponferradina, and joined the Segunda División B side permanently in 2008.

In the summer of 2009, Aitor signed for RCD Espanyol, but again only featured with the B team also in the third division. After a sole season he moved to another club in that tier, Pontevedra CF.

Aitor signed for CD Lugo – yet in division three – in July 2011, being first choice as the campaign ended in promotion. On 19 July 2012, he penned a two-year contract with CD Guadalajara.

Aitor made his Segunda División debut on 19 August 2012, playing the full 90 minutes in a 1–1 away draw against AD Alcorcón. On 22 September he scored his first goal as a professional, but in a 3–4 home loss to Real Madrid Castilla.

After suffering relegation, Aitor represented Hércules CF and CD Mirandés, both in the second tier. On 15 September 2015 the 29-year-old moved abroad for the first time in his career, joining Indian Super League team Mumbai City FC.

On returning from Asia, Aitor signed in May 2016 for Real Avilés CF of his home region ahead of their participation in the Tercera División play-offs. Following their elimination, he moved on to FC Zirka Kropyvnytskyi of the Ukrainian First League.

At the end of the January 2017 transfer window, Aitor returned to Spain and joined struggling Extremadura UD. He played regularly in his first full season, as the club won promotion to the second division for the first time in its history.

Aitor signed with third-tier Cultural y Deportiva Leonesa on 28 August 2019, after terminating his contract.

Career statistics

Club

References

External links

1986 births
Living people
Spanish footballers
Footballers from Asturias
Association football defenders
Segunda División players
Segunda División B players
Tercera División players
Rayo Cantabria players
SD Ponferradina players
RCD Espanyol B footballers
Pontevedra CF footballers
CD Lugo players
CD Guadalajara (Spain) footballers
Hércules CF players
CD Mirandés footballers
Real Avilés CF footballers
Extremadura UD footballers
Cultural Leonesa footballers
Indian Super League players
Mumbai City FC players
Ukrainian Premier League players
FC Zirka Kropyvnytskyi players
Spanish expatriate footballers
Expatriate footballers in India
Expatriate footballers in Ukraine
Spanish expatriate sportspeople in India
Spanish expatriate sportspeople in Ukraine